Denis Silva Cruz (born 28 December 1985), commonly known as Denis Silva or Denis is a Brazilian professional footballer who plays as a defender for Imperatriz-MA.  Ex-husband, by Luana Rinaldi.

Playing career 

Denis started out at Imperatriz, before moving to Gama in 2008.  After that, he moved to Khazar Lankaran.

Denis scored two goals during the 2008-2009 campaign, against MOIK Baku and Bakili Baku.

On 24 December 2012, Denis Silva re-signed with Neftchi Baku for 6 months, seeing him stay with the second till the end of the 2012–13 Azerbaijan Premier League season.  Denis Silva left Neftchi in June 2015.

In December 2019 it was confirmed, that Denis had joined São Caetano. He then joined Rio Branco-ES in February 2020.

Career statistics

Club

References

External links 
Profile on Khazar Lankaran Official Site

Brazilian footballers
Brazilian expatriate footballers
Association football defenders
1985 births
Living people
Sociedade Esportiva do Gama players
Sociedade Imperatriz de Desportos players
Grêmio Barueri Futebol players
Neftçi PFK players
Khazar Lankaran FK players
Shamakhi FK players
Associação Desportiva São Caetano players
Rio Branco Atlético Clube players
Expatriate footballers in Azerbaijan
Brazilian expatriate sportspeople in Azerbaijan